The 1954 Bowman Football Card Set was a set of football cards released by Bowman Gum in 1954, which consisted of 128 cards. They were packaged with 1-cent wax packs, which had one card inside, and 5-cent packs, which contained 7 cards. Both came with a piece of gum, causing some cards to have permanent stains on them. The two most popular cards of the set were Otto Graham (#40) & the rookie card of George Blanda (#23).

Printing
The cards were printed on four sheets, each consisting of 32 cards. Card numbers 65-96 were short-prints, meaning there weren't as many printed. Because of this, they are more valuable than most other cards in the set. A common issue caused by the printing is the centering of the cards, as it is very rare to find a card perfectly centered.

Appearance
The cards measure 2-1/2 by 3-3/4, making them slightly taller than the measurements of current cards, which are 2-1/2 by 3-1/2. The front of the card has a picture of the player on it with a banner that shows the name of the player, the team, & the team's logo. The back of the card is horizontal; the left side has a depiction of a football with the player's name and position inside. The team is on the top right, and the card number is on the top left. Under the ball contains the college the player attended, as well as their residence, age, height, & weight. Below that is a trivia question about the sport. The right of the card contains a short biography of the player. Under the biography, there are the player's statistics from the past season. For linemen & special players, the statistics are replaced with an explanation of a referee's signal. There are a few cards in the set that have a horizontal front, which is for players who were given awards for their performance or if they were elected to play in a special game such as the Pro Bowl.

Value
Compared to other football card sets from the 1950s, the 1954 set is not as expensive. This is mainly due to the fact that over 250 unopened boxes of 1954 & 1955 football cards were found in Paris, Tennessee, in 1987. Complete sets go anywhere from $2,000 to $10,000.

Checklist

References